Hydrocortisone buteprate, also known as hydrocortisone probutate and as hydrocortisone butyrate propionate, is a topical corticosteroid. It is an ester of hydrocortisone (cortisol) with butyric acid and propionic acid.

References

External links 
 

Butyrate esters
Corticosteroid esters
Corticosteroids
Propionate esters